Hindsiclava militaris is a species of sea snail, a marine gastropod mollusk in the family Pseudomelatomidae.

Description
The length of the shell varies between 25 mm and 50 mm.

The acuminately turreted shell is yellowish white, sometimes stained with brown. The whorls are decussated with nodulous longitudinal ridges and spiral striae. The upper part of the whorls are concave, edged with a slightly nodulous keel.

Distribution
This marine species occurs from Baja California, Mexico to Colombia. Fossils have been found in Late Neogene strata of Ecuador.

References
Notes

Bibliography
 Reeve, Lovell. Conchologia Iconica: Or, Illustrations of the Shells of Molluscous Animals: I. Reeve, 1843.
 Hinds, Richard Brinsley. The Zoology of the Voyage of HMS Sulphur: Under the Command of Captain Sir Edward Belcher During the Years 1836-42. Vol. 1. Smith, Elder, 1844.

External links
 William K. Emerson, Two new species of Galapagan turrid gastropods; The Veliger, v. 12 (1969-1970)
 
 

militaris
Gastropods described in 1843